Kotla is a small hill town situated on the Pathankot–Dharamshala road, in Himachal Pradesh, India. It is located in the Kangra district. Its geographical coordinates are 32° 15' 0" North, 76° 2' 0" East.

This hill town is situated in the lap of the Dhauladhar hills, in the Kangra valley of Himachal Pradesh. A hill stream cuts through the town. Across the stream is a 100-year-old bridge connecting the two sides of the town but now a new morden engineering bridge comes in use instead of old one. The town is famous for Kotla Fort, the Bagula Mukhi temple, and a number of additional religious places.

The Dehar Khad stream is an all-season stream, with fresh water coming from the higher Chamba ranges. The stream has a water mill, the ancient water-run Gharat, which is used to make flour from grains. There is another unit which makes local ice cream with the refrigeration machine powered by the flow of river water.

There is a fish tank situated about 5 km from the hill town, in the village of Soldha, which is also an interesting locality. Nearby there is a Tibetan monastery with excellent carvings and a large statue of Buddha. Just 1 km away on the Dharamshala road is Ram Tirath Ashram. Another 1 km further on there is a Hanuman mandir on the roadside. About 3 km from the town of Kotla is the Trilokinath Temple, famous for its natural cave with a Shiva lingam.

References

Villages in Kangra district